The International Journal of Intercultural Relations is a bimonthly peer-reviewed academic journal covering intercultural relations. It was established in 1977 and is the official journal of the International Academy for Intercultural Research. It is published by Elsevier and the editor-in-chief is Seth Schwartz (University of Texas at Austin). According to the Journal Citation Reports, the journal has a 2020 impact factor of 2.667.

References

External links

Elsevier academic journals
Cultural journals
Academic journals associated with international learned and professional societies
Publications established in 1977
Bimonthly journals
English-language journals